Henry Lewis is a British actor and playwright. He co-founded Mischief Theatre, responsible for The Play That Goes Wrong, Peter Pan Goes Wrong, The Comedy About a Bank Robbery, Groan Ups, Magic Goes Wrong and The Goes Wrong Show, and co-hosts Riddiculous, an ITV daytime game show.

Career 

In 2008, Lewis, Jonathan Sayer, and Henry Shields co-founded Mischief Theatre while they were studying a drama foundation course at the London Academy of Music and Dramatic Art.

In 2012, Lewis co-wrote with Sayer and Shields The Play That Goes Wrong, which premiered later that year at The Old Red Lion, Islington. Lewis played Robert Grove in both the original London cast and the original Broadway cast. In 2013, another Lewis, Sayer and Shields production, Peter Pan Goes Wrong, premiered at The Pleasance Theatre. with Lewis amongst its original cast, playing Robert.

In 2016, Lewis', Sayer's and Shields' play The Comedy About a Bank Robbery opened at the Criterion Theatre; Lewis was amongst its original cast, and played Robin Freeboys. In August 2019, Magic Goes Wrong, a play written by Lewis, Sayer, Shields, Penn and Teller, premiered at the Quays Theatre; Lewis played Mind Mangler, and subsequently took him on tour. In September 2019, the next Lewis, Sayer and Shields play, Groan Ups, premiered at Vaudeville Theatre, as part of a projected year-long residency at the theatre (later curtailed due to COVID-19 restrictions), with Lewis playing Spencer. In 2020, Lewis launched The Mystery Agency, an escape-room style puzzle game, on Kickstarter.

In 2016, a production of Peter Pan Goes Wrong was aired by BBC1, with Lewis playing Robert. The following year, they aired A Christmas Carol Goes Wrong, with Lewis playing Robert. BBC1 aired twelve episodes of The Goes Wrong Show between December 2019 and November 2021. In 2022, he played the Riddlemaster in Riddiculous, an ITV daytime game show hosted by Ranvir Singh.

Credits

Awards and nominations

References 

English male stage actors
Living people
English male television actors
English male dramatists and playwrights
21st-century English male writers
21st-century British dramatists and playwrights
21st-century English male actors
Alumni of the London Academy of Music and Dramatic Art
Year of birth missing (living people)